XHEI-FM is a radio station in San Luis Potosí City, San Luis Potosí, Mexico. Broadcasting on 93.1 FM, XHEI is owned by Grupo AS and is known as Romántica with a romantic music format.

History
XEEI-AM 1070 signed on in 1985 as Radiorama's first affiliated station in San Luis Potosí, known as Radio Servicio Social and owned by a concessionaire of the same name; its concession was awarded March 12, 1986. In the early 1990s, after doubling its power, XEEI became "La Mexicana", later "Fiesta Mexicana", and then "Romántica 10-70" in January 1999.

In 2002, MG Radio took over operations of the station, which became known as "Momentos 10-70". Radio S.A. took control in January 2006, turning XEEI into "Radio Trece 1070 AM" and rebroadcasting XEDA-AM's talk programming. MG Radio once more began operating XEEI in January 2008, giving it the Ke Buena grupera format.

In September 2010, XEEI and XHSS-FM 91.9 were sold to Radiorama, which briefly operated XEEI as "La Poderosa" with yet another new name and format. On December 29 of that year, XEEI gained its FM counterpart, XHEI-FM 93.1, and on January 31, 2011, the new AM-FM combo began stunting to a new format, "Antena Radio 93.1" (stylized as ANT:NA), with rock and alternative music. The format did not make it out of 2011, and romantic music returned on October 12 of that year.

In July 2012, as a result of XEWA-AM/XHEWA-FM's format change to Los 40 Principales, XHEI began airing select W Radio programs until January 2017.

References

External links

Mass media in San Luis Potosí City
Radio stations established in 1985
Radio stations in San Luis Potosí